Custard tarts or flan pâtissier/parisien are a baked pastry consisting of an outer pastry crust filled with egg custard.

History
The development of custard is so intimately connected with the custard tart or pie that the word itself comes from Anglo-Norman  (unattested), meaning a kind of pie. It is derived from Anglo-Norman crust (> English crust) corresponding to French . It is related to the 18th century French term , probably borrowed from the Italian  (already mentioned 13th century), derived from crosta ( in French), more probably than the Occitan . Some other names for varieties of custard tarts in the Middle Ages were doucettes and darioles. In 1399, the coronation banquet prepared for Henry IV included "doucettys".

Medieval recipes generally included a shortcrust and puff  pastry case filled with a mixture of cream, milk, or broth, with eggs, sweeteners such as sugar or honey, and sometimes spices. Recipes existed as early as the fourteenth century that would still be recognisable as custard tarts today. Tarts could also be prepared with almond milk during times of fasting such as Lent, though this was rather expensive and would have been available only to the well-off. Often, savoury ingredients such as minced pork or beef marrow were also added (the combining of sweet and savoury ingredients was more common in medieval England), but unlike a modern quiche the custard filling itself was invariably sweet. In Portugal, the tarts are dusted with cinnamon; in Britain, nutmeg is often used.

Modern versions

Modern custard tarts are usually made from shortcrust pastry, eggs, sugar, milk or cream, and vanilla, sprinkled with nutmeg and then baked. Unlike egg tart, custard tarts are normally served at room temperature.

Britain and Commonwealth
Custard tarts have long been a favourite pastry in Britain and the Commonwealth, where they are often called "egg custard tarts" or simply "egg custards" to distinguish the egg-based filling from the commonly served cornflour-based custards. They are sold in supermarkets and bakeries throughout the UK.

In the UK, the custard tart is regarded as a classic British dish. A version by Marcus Wareing was selected on the BBC television programme Great British Menu as the final course of a banquet to celebrate Queen Elizabeth's 80th birthday. The tarts are either made as a single large tart from which slices are cut, or as smaller individual tartlets. Classically, they are invariably topped only with a dusting of nutmeg – fruit topping in the French style, or cinnamon dusting in the Dutch, is not typical.

Variations on the classic recipe include the Manchester tart, where a layer of jam is spread on the pastry before the custard is added. Other versions may have some fresh fruit, or rhubarb, cooked into the filling. Versions topped with elaborate arrangements of fruit show the influence of French pâtisserie.

Hong Kong

The egg tart (traditional Chinese: 蛋撻; simplified Chinese: 蛋挞;; pinyin: dàntǎ) is a kind of custard tart found in Chinese cuisine derived from the English custard tart and Portuguese pastel de nata. The dish consists of an outer pastry crust filled with egg custard. Egg tarts are often served at dim sum restaurants, bakeries and cha chaan tengs (Hong Kong-style cafes).

Indonesia

The Indonesian version is called pai susu (milk custard pie) from Bali. This pastry consists of an outer pastry crust filled with egg custard and condensed milk, and then baked. Contrary to other versions of this pie, this Indonesian version is very flat, with the filling consisting of only one very thin layer of custard. Another type of Indonesian pie tart is pastel de nata (derived from Portuguese cuisine due to historical ties).

France
Some may contain reconstituted shortbread.

Romania

Alivenci, plural form of alivancă, is a traditional custard tart, from the cuisine of Moldavia made with cornmeal, cream cheese like urdă or telemea and smântână.

A form of cheesecake was very popular in Ancient Greece. The secret of its manufacture was passed during the Roman invasions. At that time, the Latin name used for this type of cake was placenta that was transmitted in Romanian culture.

For Saint Peter, the Moldovan prepare alivenci.

Portugal & Macau

Pastel de nata (Portuguese pronunciation: [pɐʃˈtɛɫ dɨ ˈnatɐ][b] (plural: pastéis de nata; [-ˈtɛjʃ-], [-ˈtɐjʃ-][c])) is a Portuguese egg custard tart pastry, optionally dusted with cinnamon. Outside Portugal, they are particularly popular in other parts of Western Europe, Asia and former Portuguese colonies, such as Brazil, Mozambique, Macau, Goa and East Timor. The Macanese pastel de nata was also adopted by KFC and is available in regions such as Hong Kong, Taiwan and China. In Indonesia, this pastry is especially popular in Kampung Tugu, Jakarta, a culturally Portuguese (Mardijker) enclave.

South Africa

Melktert (/ˈmɛlktɛrt/, Afrikaans for milk tart) is a South African dessert originally created by the Dutch settlers in the "Cape" (South Africa) consisting of a sweet pastry crust containing a custard filling made from milk, flour, sugar and eggs. The ratio of milk to eggs is higher than in a traditional Portuguese custard tart or Chinese egg tart, resulting in a lighter texture and a stronger milk flavour.

The dessert originated among settlers at the Dutch Cape Colony in the 17th century, and is believed to have developed from the Dutch mattentaart, a cheesecake-like dessert which was included in the cookbook Een Notabel Boexcken Van Cokeryen (A Notable Book of Cookery) published by Thomas van der Noot around 1514. Some recipes require that the custard be baked in the crust, while others call for the custard to be prepared in advance, and then placed in the crust before serving. Cinnamon is often sprinkled over its surface, and the milk used for the custard may also be infused with a cinnamon stick before preparation. A staple at church fetes and home industries, and commonplace in South African supermarkets, melktert may be served chilled or at room temperature, or slightly warmed.

See also

 Buttermilk pie
 Custard pie
 Custard slice
 Chocolate tart
 List of custard desserts
 List of desserts
 List of pies, tarts and flans

References

External links
History and recipe of the custard tart
Pastéis de Belém–The World’s First Pastéis de Nata

British desserts
British pies
Chinese desserts
Custard desserts
English cuisine
French desserts
Portuguese desserts
Hong Kong cuisine
Sweet pies
Tarts